Joseph-Marie Minala (born 24 August 1996) is a Cameroonian professional footballer who plays as a midfielder.

Club career

Early career
Minala began playing for amateur club Vigor Perconti and attracted the attention of Napoli, who gave him a two-month trial. He was spotted by Lazio scouts in 2013, while representing the region of Lazio in the Trofeo delle Regioni. He joined Lazio in the summer of 2013.

In early 2014, Minala then made news when his age was publicly disputed by multiple parties. Both Lazio and the player denied the claims. In May 2014, the Italian FA completed their investigation into the claims, confirming the accuracy of his given age and announcing that no disciplinary action would be taken against him or Lazio.

Lazio
Minala broke into Lazio's senior team on 16 March 2014, when he was an unused substitute in the match against Cagliari. He then made his full Serie A debut on 6 April, replacing Senad Lulić for the last 13 minutes of a 2–0 home win against Sampdoria.

On 25 August 2014 Minala was loaned to Serie B side Bari for the 2014–15 season. On 13 December, as a 73rd-minute substitute for Marco Augusto Romizi, he scored his first career goal, the last-minute decider in an away victory over Cittadella. He scored two more goals, and was also sent off twice.

Minala was again loaned to a Serie B team, Latina, on 6 July 2015. He made his debut on 9 August, starting in a 4–1 home defeat to Lega Pro team Pavia in the first round of the Coppa Italia. He scored his first goal for the team on 27 October, equalising in a 2–1 loss to Ternana at the Stadio Domenico Francioni. In January 2016, he rejoined Bari.

On 21 January 2017, Minala joined Serie B side Salernitana on loan with an option to buy. Two years later, he returned to the same club on loan for the rest of the season.

Minala signed with Chinese Super League club Qingdao Huanghai on loan on 28 February 2020, until the end of the year.

Lucchese
On 26 October 2021, Minala signed for Serie C team Lucchese until the end of the season.

Olbia
On 23 August 2022, Minala joined Olbia on a one-year contract. On 6 January 2023, Minala's contract with Olbia was terminated by mutual consent.

International career
Minala played for Cameroon at under-23 level in their unsuccessful qualification campaign for the 2015 Africa U-23 Cup of Nations. He scored against Sierra Leone in a 1–1 draw on 30 May 2015, but Cameroon were eliminated in the second round on away goals.

Career statistics

References

External links

1996 births
Living people
Footballers from Yaoundé
Cameroonian footballers
Association football midfielders
Serie A players
Serie B players
Serie C players
S.S. Lazio players
S.S.C. Bari players
Latina Calcio 1932 players
U.S. Salernitana 1919 players
Lucchese 1905 players
Chinese Super League players
Qingdao F.C. players
Olbia Calcio 1905 players
Cameroonian expatriate footballers
Expatriate footballers in Italy
Expatriate footballers in China
Cameroonian expatriate sportspeople in Italy
Cameroonian expatriate sportspeople in China
Age controversies
Cameroon youth international footballers